"Heading West" was the third single from Cyndi Lauper's album A Night to Remember released worldwide. It was not released as a single in North America.

"Heading West" was written by Lauper, Billy Steinberg and Tom Kelly. The same team wrote "My First Night Without You, and the latter two wrote "True Colors", and "I Drove All Night". The song is about moving on from a past relationship, which was the overall theme of the album. A video was also released which was black and white and had Lauper in an empty field. The song was released outside of the U.S. The single was a minor hit in the UK. Cyndi Lauper said in an interview with O Globo newspaper that "'Heading West' was a great song."

French Canadian pop star Mitsou covered the song as the title track for a 1992 EP and also released it as a single. She added a French spoken word monologue to the end of the song.

Track listing

Europe 7" / 2-track 3" CD single / Japan 3" CD single
 "Heading West" – 3:54
 "Calm Inside the Storm" – 3:55

UK and Australian 7" / cassette
 "Heading West" – 3:54
 "Insecurious" – 3:30

UK limited edition 7" (Compass Style Sleeve)
 "Heading West" - 3:54
 "Insecurious" - 3:30
 "Money Changes Everything" (Live at Le Zenith) - 5:37

Europe 12" / 3–track 3" CD single
 "Heading West" - 3:54
 "Calm Inside the Storm" - 3:55
 "Money Changes Everything" (album version)

UK 12"
 "Heading West" - 3:54
 "Insecurious" - 3:30
 "She Bop" (Live at Le Zenith) - 5:12

UK 5" CD single
 "Heading West" - 3:54
 "Insecurious" - 3:30
 "She Bop" (Live at Le Zenith) - 5:12
 "Money Changes Everything" (Live at Le Zenith) - 5:37

UK limited edition picture disc CD single
 "Heading West" - 3:54
 "What's Going On" (Live at Le Zenith) - 5:07
 "She Bop" (Live at Le Zenith) - 5:12
 "Money Changes Everything" (Live at Le Zenith) - 5:38

Chart performance

References

1989 songs
Cyndi Lauper songs
Songs written by Tom Kelly (musician)
Songs written by Billy Steinberg
Songs written by Cyndi Lauper
Mitsou songs
Epic Records singles